This is a list of Mosques in Brazil.  It lists mosques (Arabic: Masjid, Portuguese: Mesquita) and Islamic centres in Brazil, South America. It lists some but by no means all of the mosques in Brazil.

There are currently about 150  mosques in Brazil.

List of mosques in Brazil
Note: Mesquita means mosque in the Portuguese language used in Brazil.

See also
 Lists of mosques (worldwide)
 List of mosques in the United States
 List of mosques in Canada
 List of mosques in the Americas (Latin & South America)
 List of the oldest mosques in the world
 Islam in Brazil

References 

 
Mosques